Wolfgang Stammberger (14 July 1920 – 1 May 1982) was a German jurist and politician. He served as German Minister of Justice from 1961 to 1962.

Born in Coburg, Bavaria, Stammberger saw his studies interrupted by World War II, but eventually earned his doctorate from the University of Erlangen. He became a member of the German Bundestag in 1953, and retained his seat until 1969. In 1964, he switched from the Free Democratic Party to the Social Democratic Party. Between 1970 and 1978, he served as mayor of Coburg.

His niece, Sabine Leutheusser-Schnarrenberger, later also served as Minister of Justice.

External links
Short bio at Friedrich Naumann Stiftung

1920 births
1982 deaths
People from Coburg
German military personnel of World War II
Justice ministers of Germany
Members of the Bundestag for Bavaria
Members of the Bundestag 1965–1969
Members of the Bundestag 1961–1965
Members of the Bundestag 1957–1961
Members of the Bundestag 1953–1957
University of Erlangen-Nuremberg alumni
Members of the Bundestag for the Free Democratic Party (Germany)